Dalton North is a ward of the British town Dalton-in-Furness, within the Borough of Barrow-in-Furness. With 6,599 people residing in Dalton North in 2001, falling to 6135 at the 2011 Census,.

References

Wards of Barrow-in-Furness
Dalton-in-Furness